Ariane flight VA256 was an Ariane 5 rocket flight that launched the James Webb Space Telescope into space on 25 December 2021. It was 2021's final Ariane flight, its most valuable payload to date, and the  Ariane mission. The launch was described by NASA as "flawless" and "perfect".

Launch configuration

Rocket

Ariane 5 is a heavy lift two-stage rocket with two solid fuel boosters. It was used in its ECA variant, which offers the highest payload mass capacity.

Payload

The only payload on the flight was the James Webb Space Telescope (JWST), a NASA/ESA space-based observatory. The launch is one of the European Space Agency's contributions to the project.

Preparation campaign

Arrival in Kourou
The payload arrived in Kourou, French Guiana, on  where it was unloaded from the MN Colibri cargo ship and transported to the space centre.

Integration incident 
On  an incident was reported by NASA and Arianespace that a clamp band securing the payload to the adapter was released during integration activities, causing vibrations to the telescope. After some tests were performed, a review board concluded on  that no payload component was damaged, and fuelling operations could be started on the next day, with the launch planned for 22 December 2021 at that time.

Fuelling operations

Final assembly

Interface communication issue

Weather issue
Unfavorable weather forecasts for  delayed the launch to Christmas Day, .

Launch

The rocket was launched from the ELA-3 launch pad of the Guiana Space Centre on 25 December 2021 at 12:20 UTC (09:20 local time, 7:20 am U.S. EST). The DDO (in French: Directeur des Opérations) of the launch was Jean-Luc Voyer, who concluded his shift by saying, "Go Webb!"

The launch was described by NASA as "flawless" and "perfect". A NASA systems engineer said “the efficiency or the accuracy with which Ariane put us on orbit and our accuracy and effectiveness in implementing our mid-course corrections” meant that there is “quite a bit of fuel margin ... roughly speaking, it’s around 20 years of propellant.”

Orbit
The James Webb Space Telescope was injected into a transfer trajectory that took it to the second Earth-Sun Lagrange point (L).

The separation of the launch vehicle second stage and the spacecraft occurred approximately 27 minutes after liftoff. The second stage downloaded video, the last known time the telescope will be seen, of the separation and initial deployment of the solar panels. After this separation, the telescope became autonomous and began its deployment sequence. About 29 days after liftoff, it executed a maneuver placing it into a halo orbit around the L point, where it can perform its science mission. Its next five months were spent on cooling NIRCam and the Mid-Infrared Instrument down further, calibrating its mirrors while focusing on HD 84406, a bright star in the constellation Ursa Major, and testing the instruments.

See also

 James Webb Space Telescope
 Timeline of the James Webb Space Telescope
 Launch and commissioning of the James Webb Space Telescope
 Ariane launches

References

External links

 James Webb Space Telescope detaches from Ariane 5 rocket
 Ariane flight VA256 at Arianespace

VA256, Ariane flight
2021 in French Guiana
2021 in spaceflight
Rocket launchers
Rocket launches in 2021
James Webb Space Telescope